Serra de Pàndols  is a limestone mountain chain located at the southern end of the Catalan Pre-Coastal Range, in Catalonia, Spain.

There is a project to install wind turbines on the Serra de Pàndols and neighboring Serra de Cavalls which has met with public protests. The Serra de Paüls mountain range is located to the south of this range.

Hill 705
The ridge's highest point is Punta Alta (705.5 m). This summit was known as Hill 705 (Cota 705) during the Battle of the Ebro, the bloodiest and most protracted series of combats in the Spanish Civil War (1936–39). The Battle was also the last action of the International Brigades, who were withdrawn midway through it.

Close to the peak stands a monument to those who died in the battles. Hill 705 was a key position to control the Serra de Pàndols range at the time of the Battle of the Ebro. The summit lies within the Pinell de Brai municipal term.

See also
Battle of the Ebro 
11th Division (Spain)
International Brigades
Catalan Pre-Coastal Range

References

Bibliography
Jaume Aguadé i Sordé, El diari de guerra de Lluís Randé i Inglés; Batalles del Segre i de l’Ebre i camps de concentració (abril 1938 - juliol 1939), El Tinter

External links

Serres de Pàndols-Cavalls, proposta d'ampliació del Parc Natural del Port 
Pinell de Brai Town Hall Webpage
La Batalla de l'Ebre

Pandols
Military history of Catalonia